More Light may refer to:

More Light Presbyterians, an American religious movement
More Light (J Mascis + The Fog album), 2000
More Light (Primal Scream album), 2013

See also

 "Mehr Licht!" (German, 'More light!'), the supposed last words of Johann Wolfgang von Goethe
Mehr Licht!, an Albanian literary and cultural magazine